Bandeira River may refer to:

Bandeira River (Chopim River), a river of Paraná state in southern Brazil
Bandeira River (Piquiri River), a river of Paraná state in southern Brazil